Wurmbrand is surname of:

 Count Wurmbrand-Stuppach, an old noble family of Austria
 Melchior Freiherr von Wurmbrand(-Stuppach) (1475 - 1553), businessman and military man
 Johann Wilhelm Graf von Wurmbrand (1670 - 1750), statesman and historian
 Adelma Vay, née Wurmbrand-Stuppach (1840, Ternopil - 1925, Gonobitz (now ), Styria)
 Countess Stephanie von Wurmbrand-Stuppach (1849 - 1919), a Hungarian pianist and composer
 Countess Maria Anna Paula Ferdinandine von Wurmbrand-Stuppach (1914, Vienna - 2003)

 Richard Wurmbrand (1909–2001), Romanian evangelical Christian minister, author

See also 
 also Wurmbrand is a Katastralgemeinde in Lower Austria
 Stuppach

References 

German-language surnames
Jewish surnames